Ambu Island is an isle off the coast of Mumbai near Madh Island located at  in the Arabian Sea. The isle is accessible during low tide across a rocky isthmus. A mosque is built on the island. There is also a makeshift church and a small Hindu Temple. The ruins of an old tower stand next to a small lighthouse.

Islands of Mumbai
Islands of India
Populated places in India